Queer archaeology is an approach to archaeology that uses queer theory to challenge normative, and especially heteronormative, views of the past.

Queer archaeology does not attempt to look for past examples of homosexual people, of other sexual orientations or alternative gender identities in history, or to explain the origin of these concepts. What it does intend is to favor a critical point of view and escape from the normative and binary assumptions of the predominant archaeological discourse. In this last point, queer archaeology coincides with feminist archaeology. This does not only represent a look at women from the past or an introduction of this gender in the interpretations of the past, but also and above all to challenge the sexist values ​​of archaeological interpretations.

Difference between feminist, gender, and queer archaeology 
Feminist, gender and queer archaeology were appearing as an evolution of one another, and were influenced by different social movements such as the feminist movement or the queer movement.

Feminist archaeology 
The first of the three that appeared was feminist archaeology, because of the symbiosis with all the feminist movements that emerged during the 20th century throughout Europe and the United States. This had the merit, for the first time, to criticize and question the practice of bringing current values (regarding gender roles) to the past, both consciously and unconsciously, in archaeological researches. Furthermore, feminist archaeologies tend to try to answer questions such as: has gender inequality always existed or is it a historical product? Or, more broadly, are social inequality and exploitation inherent to humanity or are they the result of historical transformations?

Gender archaeology 
Gender archaeology appears as a reaction to the previous approach and focuses on offering information on gender, without other political connotations. Also, sometimes, this is disconnected from the initial feminist approach, offering more freedom when making interpretations.
Gender and feminist archeology are sometimes used synonymously, reversed in their meanings, or studied together. This means that the difference between the two is, many times, not defined and conditioned by the opinion of each archaeologist.

Queer archaeology 
Queer archaeology arose thanks to the appearance of queer theories  and as a criticism of the two previous ones, in their use of gender / sex equality,  the non-contemplation of different cultures, ethnicities and social classes, and their Eurocentric vision. It also defends that the great variety of social identities and the questioning of concepts such as  family or  family unit must be considered.

See also 
 Queer studies
 Queer theology

References

External links 
 Queer Archaeology Bibliography 

Queer theory
Archaeological theory
Feminism and history